The estrogen provocation test, also known as the estrogen stimulation test or estrogen challenge test, is a diagnostic procedure used to evaluate the function of the hypothalamic–pituitary–gonadal axis. It involves the administration of a large amount of estrogen, resulting in estrogenic exposure similar to or greater than normal preovulatory estradiol levels, in an attempt to induce a positive feedback surge in levels of the gonadotropins, luteinizing hormone (LH) and follicle-stimulating hormone (FSH). Estrogens that have been used in the estrogen provocation test include estradiol benzoate, estradiol valerate, ethinylestradiol, and high-dose transdermal estradiol patches. The test involves sustained estrogenic exposure equivalent to estradiol levels of 200 to 300 pg/mL or more for at least 50 hours and results in a surge in gonadotropin levels about 32 to 72 hours following initiation of estrogenic exposure. Levels of LH and FSH increase during the gonadotropin surge by about 10-fold and 4-fold, respectively.

See also
 Progestogen challenge test
 Pharmacodynamics of estradiol § Progonadotropic effects

References

Estrogens
Female genital procedures